Charles Jeantaud (1840-1906) was a French engineer who invented the parallelogram steering linkage in 1878.

Early life
He was born in Limoges, in what is now the Haute-Vienne department of central France.

Career
In 1881 he built his first electric car, with help from Camille Alphonse Faure, who had built the first modern day car battery in 1881. The vehicle had a Gramme-design electric motor with a Fulmen-made battery.
From 1893 to 1906 he built vehicles under the trademark Jeantaud in Paris.

Personal life
He committed suicide in 1906.

See also
 History of the electric vehicle

References
http://www.lepopulaire.fr/limoges/loisirs/art-litterature/2015/03/22/le-limougeaud-charles-jeantaud-fut-lun-des-peres-de-la-voiture-electrique_11374211.html

1840 births
1906 suicides
French automotive pioneers
Automotive steering technologies
19th-century French inventors
French mechanical engineers
People from Limoges
Suicides in France
1906 deaths